Protein phosphatase 1 regulatory subunit 1B (PPP1R1B), also known as dopamine- and cAMP-regulated neuronal phosphoprotein (DARPP-32), is a protein that in humans is encoded by the PPP1R1B gene.

Function 

Midbrain dopaminergic neurons play a critical role in multiple brain functions, and abnormal signaling through dopaminergic pathways has been implicated in several major neurologic and psychiatric disorders. One well studied target for the actions of dopamine is DARPP32. In the densely dopamine- and glutamate-innervated rat caudate-putamen, DARPP32 is expressed in medium-sized spiny neurons that also express dopamine D1 receptors. The function of DARPP32 seems to be regulated by receptor stimulation. Both dopaminergic and glutamatergic (NMDA) receptor stimulation regulate the extent of DARPP32 phosphorylation, but in opposite directions. Dopamine D1 receptor stimulation enhances cAMP formation, resulting in the phosphorylation of DARPP32; (this is disputed by more recent research that claims cAMP signaling induces dephosphorylation of DARPP32) phosphorylated DARPP32 is a potent protein phosphatase-1 (PPP1CA) inhibitor. NMDA receptor stimulation elevates intracellular calcium, which leads to activation of calcineurin and dephosphorylation of phospho-DARPP32, thereby reducing the phosphatase-1 inhibitory activity of DARPP32. DARPP-32 is critical for dopamine dependent striatal synaptic plasticity, possibly by serving as a dopamine-dependent gating mechanism for calcium/CaMKII signaling. It has been predicted that DARPP-32, in conjunction with ARPP-21, could also be involved in setting-up of eligibility trace-like temporal window for striatal postsynaptic signaling.

Clinical significance

CNS 

This gene is also known as DARPP-32, highlighting its role as a  dopamine- and cyclic AMP-regulated phosphoprotein. As such PPP1R1B affects dopamine, glutamate and adenosine; and there is some support for a role of the gene in schizophrenia, as well as being involved in the action of  drugs including cocaine, amphetamine, nicotine, LSD, caffeine, PCP, ethanol and morphine, and in Parkinson's disease or EPS (Extra-pyramidal symptoms). DARPP-32 levels are decreased in the dorsolateral prefrontal cortex and lymphocytes of both schizophrenia and bipolar disorder patients. This alteration is suggested to be related to the pathology, since antipsychotics do not regulate the expression of DARPP-32.

A considerable proportion of the psychomotor effects of cannabinoids can be accounted for by a signaling cascade in striatal projection neurons involving PKA-dependent phosphorylation of DARPP-32, achieved via modulation of dopamine D2 and adenosine A2A transmission.

PPP1R1B has also been associated with improved transfer of information between the striatum and the prefrontal cortex, suggesting that variants of PPP1R1B can in some circumstances lead to improved and more flexible cognition, while, in the presence of other genetic and environmental factors, it may lead to symptoms of schizophrenia.

Cancer 

There are two protein products encoded by PPP1R1B: DARPP-32 and t-Darpp. t-Darpp is a truncated version of DARPP-32 as it is missing the first 36 amino acids at the N-terminus. Both isoforms are overexpressed in a number of cancers including those derived from gastric, colon, prostate, esophageal, breast, and lung tissues. In Her-2-positive breast cancer cells, t-Darpp overexpression imparts resistance to Trastuzumab (Herceptin), the chemotherapy drug that shuts down the Her-2 signaling pathway.

Regulation 

Brain-derived neurotrophic factor regulates the expression of DARPP-32. The Akt and CDK5/p35 intracellular pathway is suggested to be involved on this regulation. Also, neuronal calcium sensor-1 was suggested to modulate the expression of DARPP-32.

Discovery 

PPP1R1B was discovered by Paul Greengard and his co-workers.

Interactive pathway map

References

Further reading